Vanadium(II) iodide is the inorganic compound with the formula VI2.  It is a black micaceous solid.  It adopts the cadmium iodide structure, featuring octahedral V(II) centers.  The hexahydrate [V(H2O)6]I2, an aquo complex, is also known. It forms red-violet crystals.  The hexahydrate dehydrates under vacuum to give a red-brown tetrahydrate with the formula V(H2O)4I2.

Preparation
The original synthesis of VI2 involved reaction of the elements.

Solvated vanadium(II) iodides can be prepared by reduction of vanadium(III) chlorides with trimethylsilyl iodide. It reacts with anhydrous ammonia to give the hexaammine complex.

References

Vanadium(II) compounds
Iodides
Metal halides